Israel competed at the 1960 Summer Olympics in Rome, Italy. 23 competitors, 17 men and 6 women, took part in 28 events in 7 sports.

Results by event

Athletics

Cycling

Two cyclists, both men, represented Israel in 1960.

Fencing

Two sabre fencers, both men, represented Israel in 1960.

Gymnastics

Shooting

Two shooters represented Israel in 1960.

Swimming

Weightlifting

References

External links
Official Olympic Reports

Nations at the 1960 Summer Olympics
1960 Summer Olympics
Summer Olympics